Corinth is an unincorporated community in Southampton County, Virginia, United States.

References

Unincorporated communities in Southampton County, Virginia
Unincorporated communities in Virginia